Jean-Claude Van Damme: Behind Closed Doors is a 2011 British reality show, in the fly on the wall style,  featuring action star Jean-Claude Van Damme. It aired on ITV4 in the United Kingdom.

Plot
The documentary presents insights into the professional, family, and home life of kickboxer and action star Jean-Claude Van Damme. He is  preparing for a kickboxing fight for the first time since 1982 and also takes the audience behind the scenes of his latest movies.

List of episodes

Series 1

Home media
The show was released as a two-disc set on 16 May 2011.

References

External links

2011 British television series debuts
2011 British television series endings
ITV documentaries
2010s British documentary television series
2010s British reality television series
English-language television shows